Shooting sports at the 1962 Asian Games was held in Tjibubur (EYD: Cibubur) Shooting Range in Jakarta, Indonesia, between 27 and 31 August 1962. Shooting comprised 5 events, all opened to both men and women.

Japan dominated the competition after winning three out of five possible gold medals, South Korea and Singapore won the remaining gold medals.

Medalists

Medal table

References 

 ISSF Results Overview

External links
Asian Shooting Federation

 
1962 Asian Games events
1962
Asian Games
1962 Asian Games